Dipterocarpus lamellatus is a tropical rainforest tree endemic to Borneo. It is known from the Beaufort Hills, the Siangau Forest Reserve and Labuan in SW Sabah and Ladan Hills in the Tutong district of Brunei. It is one of the rarest and most endangered of all dipterocarps, with a population size of only twelve individuals, threatened mostly by habitat loss.

References

lamellatus
Endemic flora of Borneo
Trees of Borneo
Critically endangered flora of Asia
Taxa named by Joseph Dalton Hooker